No. 1 Squadron RAF Regiment is a field squadron of the RAF Regiment in the Royal Air Force. Its mission is protection of RAF bases from ground attack, and patrolling a large area around main operating bases abroad, in order to defend aircraft on ingress and egress from surface to air attack. It is currently based at RAF Honington.

History 

It is a unit with a long history having its origin on 22 December 1921, when "No. 1 Armoured Car Company RAF" was formed at Heliopolis in Egypt. After undergoing many expansions and contractions No.1 Armoured Car Company was merged with No. 2701 Squadron RAF Regiment, and then on 25 February 1947 was renamed No. 1 (Armoured Car) Squadron RAF Regiment. The squadron initially retained its armoured car role, but lost this in 1953 when it assumed the dismounted field squadron role. The squadron was re-roled to a Light Anti-Aircraft unit in the late 1960s and early 1970s. It was then re-roled as a light armoured squadron, equipped initially with Saracen Armoured Personnel Carriers, and subsequently with the Combat Vehicle Reconnaissance (Tracked)  series of vehicles, including Scorpion, Spartan, Sultan and Samson. In 1992, the RAF Regiment withdrew the CVR(T) from service and No. 1 Squadron reverted to the field role, in which it has remained since.

During the Cold War the squadron was predominantly based in Germany. It took part in the Berlin Airlift and numerous exercises. After a number of moves it found a more permanent home at RAF Laarbruch. At the end of 1998 the squadron was re-located to the UK, based at RAF St Mawgan in Cornwall. In the aftermath of the Cold War the squadron has seen frequent action. It was deployed against Iraq both in the 1991 Gulf War and in the 2003 invasion of Iraq. In addition it has been tasked with peacekeeping duties in the former Yugoslavia, including Bosnia, Croatia and Macedonia, and periodic deployments to Northern Ireland and Cyprus, and to Kuwait in support of British forces operating there. The squadron took part in Exercise SAIF SAREEA in 2001 and elements were quickly re-tasked for operations in Afghanistan during Operation VERITAS. In 2003, No. 1 Squadron took part in the invasion of Iraq with 16 Air Assault Brigade and subsequently with 3 Commando Brigade. It was awarded the battle honour Iraq 2003 for its contribution. The squadron has returned to Iraq on three occasions since 2003, defending the Contingency Operating Base at Basra.

Casualties 

On 19 July 2007, two Senior Aircraftmen from No.1 Squadron, SAC Matthew "Lip" Caulwell (22) of Birmingham and SAC Peter "Pete" McFerran (24) of Connah's Quay were killed during a rocket attack on Basrah Airfield. RAuxAF SAC Christopher Dunsmore attached to No.1 Squadron was also killed in an insurgent indirect fire attack on their base in Iraq. On 7 August 2007 Leading Aircraftman Martin ‘Beardy’ Beard from Mansfield was killed on his sister Rachael's 22nd birthday, during a fire fight with Iraqi insurgents in the Battle of Al Waki Market. This last action resulted in the award of the Military Cross to one of the section commanders. The Officer Commanding, Sqn Ldr Sutton was awarded the OBE.

During No 1. Squadron's last tour (2010) defending Bastion Air Base (Helmand Province, Afghanistan) the squadron lost two gunners; Senior Aircraftman Kinikki Griffiths who was involved in a road traffic accident on patrol whilst serving with B flight and Senior Aircraftman Scott Hughes (C flight). Hughes was killed when he was hit by a British Army Power boat in Cyprus whilst swimming in a recreation area during decompression (a period of rest and relaxation which is thought to help troops relax before returning home).

References

External links
 Official Website
 RAF Web

1
1
1